The Co-operative Press is a co-operative whose principal activity is the publication of Co-op News. The society's stated mission is to "connect, champion and challenge the global co-operative movement". The co-operative's members are the subscribers of Co-op News.

Founded in Manchester in 1873, the Co-operative Press is still headquartered in the city, at Holyoake House.

The society was first incorporated as the Co-operative Newspaper Society by a group of co-operative societies to take on the publishing of The Co-operative News. Printing was carried out by the Co-operative Printing Society.

In 1921 the society merged with the Scottish Co-operative Newspaper Society and renamed itself as the National Co-operative Publishing Society, before taking on its current name – the Co-operative Press – in 1935.

In 1971 the Society took over the co-operative Birmingham Printers, and in 1972 merged with the Co-operative Printing Society.

Publications

Co-op News 

Co-op News is a monthly news magazine and website for the global co-operative movement. First published in 1871 as The Co-operative News, it is the world's oldest co-operative newspaper.

Reynold's News

In 1921, the society acquired the popular and radical Sunday paper, the Reynold's Illustrated News. In 1936 the paper was renamed the Reynold's News, and was relaunched in 1962 as a tabloid, titled The Sunday Citizen. Declining sales led to the decision to cease publication in 1967.

Millgate Monthly
First published in 1905, the Millgate Monthly was a cultural magazine containing articles written by co-operators on social issues, alongside poetry and reviews. It changed its name to simply The Millgate in 1928, and ceased publication in 1953.

See also 

 Co-op News
 Reynold's News

References

External links
 Co-op News

Co-operatives in the United Kingdom
Companies based in Manchester
Newspaper companies of the United Kingdom
Publishing cooperatives
Consumers' co-operatives of the United Kingdom